Sopio Tkeshelashvili (also spelled Tqeshelashvili; born 23 October 1979) is a Georgian chess player who holds the FIDE title of Woman Grandmaster.

She won the Under-12 girls European Youth Chess Championship in 1991 and the European Junior Girls Championship twice, in 1997 and 1998.

She competed, being eliminated in the first round, in the Women's World Chess Championship 2000 and Women's World Chess Championship 2004.

References

External links 

Sopio Tqeshelashvili chess games at 365Chess.com

1979 births
Living people
Chess woman grandmasters
Female chess players from Georgia (country)
Place of birth missing (living people)